The 1950 Rice Owls football team represented Rice University during the 1950 college football season. The Owls were led by 11th-year head coach Jess Neely and played their home games at the newly-constructed Rice Stadium in Houston, Texas. The team competed as members of the Southwest Conference, finishing tied for fifth.

Schedule

References

Rice
Rice Owls football seasons
Rice Owls football